Vendetta – ersguterjunge Sampler Vol. 2 is the second compilation album by the artists signed to German hip hop label ersguterjunge.

Track listing 

Samples
"Eine Nummer für sich" contains a sample of "Perdition" by Dark Sanctuary

Charts

Weekly charts

Year-end charts

References

External links
https://web.archive.org/web/20100603053043/http://zeitzeuge.blog.de/2008/10/06/musik-bushido-klaut-nox-arcana-4830657/
https://web.archive.org/web/20080610050653/http://www.mtv.de/charts/Album_Jahrescharts_2007

Hip hop compilation albums
2006 compilation albums
Record label compilation albums